Der Reserveheld is an East German comedy film. It was released in 1965 and starred Rolf Herricht and Marita Böhme.

References

External links 
 

1965 films
East German films
1960s German-language films
1960s German films